Zhongzhai is a rural town in Xinhuang Dong Autonomous County, Hunan, China. It borders Hetan Town in the north, Mibei Miao Ethnic Township in the east, Fuluo Town in the west, and Zhuxi Township in the south.

History
During the Qing dynasty (1644–1911), it was known as "Zhonghe City". After the founding of the Communist State in 1951, the People's Government of the 6th District was established. In July 1956, the Zhongzhai Township was set up. In December 1984 it was upgraded to a town. In December 2015, some parts of the Bilang Township and Lishu Township were incorporated into the town.

Geography
The Zhonghe Stream winds through the town.

Economy
The local economy is primarily based upon agriculture and local industry. The main native products are wood, tobacco and medicinal materials. The main cash crops are potatoes.

Attractions
The Wind-rain Bridge is a famous scenic spot in the town and Xinhuang Dong Autonomous County. It was rebuilt in 2003. The Wind-rain Bridge is the symbolized cultural landscape and architecture of the Dong people. It has a deep connotation of culture, philosophy and architecture art, it also contains plenty of ecological aesthetic implications.

References

Xinhuang